Mount Wilbur is a mountain standing 3.2 km (2 mi) east of Mount Weaver at the head of the Scott Glacier, in the Queen Maud Mountains, Antarctica. Discovered in December 1934 by the Byrd Antarctic Expedition geological party under Quin Blackburn, and named by Byrd for Curtis D. Wilbur, Secretary of the Navy, 1925–29.

References

Queen Maud Mountains
Mountains of the Ross Dependency
Amundsen Coast